Lelepa can refer to:

 Lelepa Island, Vanuatu
 Lelepa language, Vanuatuan language
 Lelepa, Samoa, a village on Savai'i, Samoa